Scutiger is a genus of fungi in the family  Albatrellaceae, which includes S. oregonensis, the fungus tuber.

General characteristics
Species in Scutiger are terrestrial, annual, and usually have simple, bright-colored, mesoporous hymenophores. The surface anoderm is variously decorated; the context is usually white, but rarely colored, and is fleshy to tough—rigid and fragile when dry. The Hymenium is porous, can be white or colored, and has thin-walled tubes; The spores are smooth, or rarely echinulate and hyaline.

The surface of the pileus can be uneven, squamous, or rugose as in S. oregonensis or S. decurrens; or smooth and hispid-tomentose, as in S. hispidellus (synonymous with Jahnoporus hirtus, which was named for this quality.

Species list
 S. auriscalpium
 S. brasiliensis
 S. caeruleoporus
 S. cryptopus
 S. decurrens
 S. ellisii (synonymous with Albatrellus ellisii or greening goat's foot)
 S. hispidellus (synonymous with Jahnoporus hirtus)
 S. holocyaneus 
 S. oregonensis
 S. subrubescens
 S. subsquamosus
 S. tuberosus

References

Russulales
Russulales genera